Emilio Tuñón Álvarez (born 1 January 1959 in Madrid) is a Spanish architect. In 2014, Mansilla + Tuñón Architects received the Gold Medal of Merit in the Fine Arts (Spain) from the Spanish Ministry of Culture.

Alvarez graduated from the ETSAM School of Architecture in 1981, obtaining a PhD in 1998. He was with the Fine Arts Cultural Department (1982) and the Architecture Public Works and Urban Planning Department (1983). Until 1992, he worked in the office of Spanish architect Rafael Moneo. In 1992, Alvarez and Luis Moreno Mansilla established the architecture firm Mansilla + Tuñón Architects.

Tuñón is a professor of ETSAM's architectural design department and has been visiting professor in several universities: Harvard University Graduate School of Design, Ecole Polytechnique Fédérale de Lausanne, Frankfurt Städelschule, Navarra Architecture School, Barcelona Architecture School, New Puerto Rico  Architecture School.

Projects completed by Mansilla + Tuñón Architects include: Pedro Barrié de la Maza Foundation in Vigo (2005), Museo de Arte Contemporáneo de Castilla y León (2004), Auditorium of León (2003), Madrid Regional Documentary Centre (2002) Fine Arts Museum of Castellón (2000), Indoor Swimming-Pool in San Fernando de Henares (1998), Archeological and Fine Arts Provincial Museum of Zamora (1996) and the Royal Collections Museum in Madrid, which is currently under construction.

Awards 
 Spanish Architecture Award (2003)
 Mies van der Rohe Award for European Architecture for MUSAC) (2007)
 Gold Medal of Merit in the Fine Arts (Medalla de Oro al mérito en las Bellas Artes) (2014)
 Francqui Chair (2014) Francqui Foundation
 Spanish Architecture Award (2017)

Gallery

Literature 
 Luis Mansilla. Emilio Tuñón: Mansilla + Tuñón 1992–2012. In: El Croquis. Nr. 161, 2012, .
 Luis Fernández-Galiano: Mansilla + Tuñón 1992–2011. In: AV Monographs. Nr. 144, 2010,

References

External links 
 Mansilla + Tuñón Arquitectos
 Playgrounds M+T
 Wikipedia

People from Madrid
Spanish architects
Living people
Polytechnic University of Madrid alumni
1959 births